Chuck Winder is a Republican member of the Idaho Senate. He serves as the president pro tempore of the Idaho Senate and previously served as the majority leader. He is married to Dianne Winder; the couple has two children.

Early life, education, and career
Winder joined the United States Navy where he served for four years on active duty as a naval aviator and for eight years on inactive reserve. He received a bachelor's degree in political science and pre-law from the College of Idaho.

Winder is a commercial real estate brokerage.

Political career
He ran for the Republican nomination in 1994 for Governor of Idaho losing with 13.5% of the vote.

He is a former member of the Ada County Highway District Commission. He previously served on both the Boise City Design Review Committee and the Boise Planning and Zoning Commission.

In 2003, Winder ran for mayor of Boise, Idaho, but lost to David H. Bieter.

From 2005 through 2008, Winder was a co-chair of the Treasure Valley's Coalition for Regional Public Transportation. In 2008, the coalition merged with the statewide Moving Idaho Forward organization.

Winder serves as the president pro tempore of the Idaho Senate, and previously served as majority leader.

In the Republican Party presidential primaries, 2012 Winder supported Mitt Romney.

Organizations
Lifetime member of United States Navy League 
Vice President of Ore-Ida Council, Boy Scouts of America, 4 years 
Boise Metro Economic Development Council
Children's Home Society of Idaho. 
Junior Achievement of Idaho (former president) 
Co-chairman Treasure Valley Transit Coalition
Board of Directors Jeker Family Trust
Board of Directors Children's Home Society of Idaho
Boise Chamber of Commerce
Valley Initiative for Prosperity
Co-founder and initial President, Joint School District #2, Education Foundation
Idaho Coordinator for the National Prayer Breakfast
Chairman of the Idaho Transportation Board, 11 years
Co-chairman of the Governor's Blue Ribbon Task Force
Trustee at Albertson's College of Idaho, 12 years
Bible Study Fellowship (Boise Evening Men's), 20+ years
Boise City Planning & Zoning Commission, 3 years
Boise City Design & Review Committee, 4 years
Ada County Highway District Commission, 12.5 years
Ada Planning Association, 12.5 years

References

External links
Chuck Winder at Idaho Legislature
Winder for Senate campaign website

|-

21st-century American politicians
College of Idaho alumni
Republican Party Idaho state senators
Living people
People from Ontario, Oregon
Military personnel from Oregon
Aviators from Oregon
United States Naval Aviators
Year of birth missing (living people)